The Salah Bey Viaduct, is a cable-stayed bridge that spans the gorge valley of the Rhumel River in Constantine, North East Algeria is named after Salah Bey whose rule of the city (1771-1797) was marked by major urban works, This viaduct is already considered the "eighth wonder" of the city with seven bridges. With a length of 1119m, the viaduct has a futuristic design, which modernized the urban configuration of the city.

Characteristics
The Salah Bey Viaduct is the eighth bridge in Constantine, the longest with 756 meters for the main viaduct and 4.3 kilometers, counting the connections and accesses. Resting on eight shrouds and culminating at 130 meters.

Connections
The Viaduct Salah Bey was extended and connected with the  A1 Algeria East–West Highway by two sides (North and  South ).

Inauguration
The Salah Bey Bridge was inaugurated on July 26, 2014, by Prime Minister Abdelmalek Sellal, named after the governor of Constantine Salah Bey from 1771 to 1792.

See also

List of longest cable-stayed bridge spans
List of bridges by length
List of highest bridges in the world
List of tallest bridges in the world
Pont de Normandie
Baluarte Bridge
Sidi Rached Viaduct
Bab El Kantra Bridge
Sidi M'Cid Bridge
Mellah Slimane Bridge

References

External links

Viaducts
Cable-stayed bridges in Algeria
High-tech architecture
Viaducts in Algeria
Landmarks in Algeria
Buildings and structures in Constantine Province
Transport in Constantine, Algeria
Bridges completed in 2014
Bridges in Constantine, Algeria
21st-century architecture in Algeria